Alfred DePew is an American-born Canadian short story writer, and journalist.

Life
He grew up in St. Louis.
He taught at Maine College of Art.  He lived in Portland, Maine. 
In 2006, he moved to Vancouver.
He writes for the Vancouver Observer.

Awards
 1990 Flannery O'Connor Award for Short Fiction
 1988 Artist Fellows Maine Arts Commission

Work

References

External links

Writers from St. Louis
American emigrants to Canada
American short story writers
Year of birth missing (living people)
Living people
Journalists from British Columbia
Journalists from Missouri
Writers from Vancouver